Van Dort is a Dutch surname. Notable people with the surname include:

J. L. K. van Dort (1831–1891), 19th-century Ceylonese Burgher artist
Joop van Dort (1889–1967), Dutch footballer
Liz Van Dort, Australian singer
Sharina van Dort (born 1988), Dutch handball player
Wieteke van Dort (born 1943), Dutch actor, singer and comedian

See also
Vandort

Dutch-language surnames